Mount Vernon Station is a pastoral lease that operates as a cattle station.

Mount Vernon has common boundaries with Bulloo Downs, Tangadee, Pingandy, Mininer and Turee Creek Stations as well as vacant crown land.

The country varies from the alluvial plains flanking the river that support various native grasses to the rugged mountain and dolomite hills that support tall shrubland and spinifex plains. It has an estimated carrying capacity of 4,150 cattle and in 1979 was carrying 1,200 head of cattle. 
 

The station had been acquired by J. A. and C. Meehan who held the lease until selling the property for £18,000 in 1951. The Panizza family, a well known pastoralist family from Dardanup, had bought the property.

A light plane crash at the property in 2006 killed a 26-year-old station hand and a toddler.

See also
List of ranches and stations

References

Pastoral leases in Western Australia
Stations (Australian agriculture)
Mid West (Western Australia)